Gáspár Boldizsár is a Hungarian sprint canoer who competed from 1989 to 1995. He won six medals at the ICF Canoe Sprint World Championships with two golds (C-4 500 m: 1993, 1994), three silvers (C-2 1000 m: 1994, C-4 1000 m: 1990, 1990), and one bronze (C-1 1000 m: 1989).

References

Hungarian male canoeists
Living people
Year of birth missing (living people)
ICF Canoe Sprint World Championships medalists in Canadian
20th-century Hungarian people